The 1991 Tour du Haut Var was the 23rd edition of the Tour du Haut Var cycle race and was held on 23 February 1991. The race started in Sainte-Maxime and finished in Roquebrune-sur-Argens. The race was won by Éric Caritoux.

General classification

References

1991
 February 1991 sports events in Europe
1991 in road cycling
1991 in French sport